Kjell Alexander Edfalk (born 21 December 1945) is a Swedish curler.

Teams

References

External links
 
 

Living people
1945 births
Swedish male curlers